Hemiandrus jacinda is a species of wētā endemic to New Zealand. It was first described by Steven A. Trewick in 2021. This species was named in honour of the Prime Minister of New Zealand, Jacinda Ardern. 

A relatively large glossy, wētā with long legs and striking orange-red colouring in adults. Hemiandrus jacinda is nocturnal and it is expected that individuals roost during the day in burrows as with other Hemiandrus ground wētā. There are few records so the abundance of this species is uncertain, but the geographic range extends from Far North to Taranaki.

References

Weta
Insects described in 2021
Endemic fauna of New Zealand
Jacinda Ardern
Anostostomatidae
Endemic insects of New Zealand